The Federation Cup is a soccer competition established in 1962 that is held between clubs who are affiliated with Capital Football in the Australian Capital Territory (ACT) and surrounding areas of New South Wales. It is the premier cup competition in the region. Since 2014, the Federation Cup has concurrently served as the ACT competition for the preliminary rounds of the FFA Cup, now known as the Australia Cup, with the cup winner representing the ACT.

Canberra FC currently holds the record for most titles, having lifted the Cup 18 times. Cooma Tigers are the current cup holders, having lifted the Cup in 2021.

Current Cup Competitions 2013-onwards 

The current format is a qualifying competition for the FFA Cup, now known as the Australia Cup, where the winner qualifies for the Round of 32.
Scheduling issues meant the 2014 winner was not decided until after the qualifier needed to be named. To overcome this Capital Football announced that the 2014 winner of the ACTs pre-season competition was to be the ACTs qualifier in 2014.  However, Tuggeranong United as the 2013 Federation Cup winners successfully appealed to Capital Football to qualify them as ACTs 2014 FFA Cup entrant. The 2014 winner – Belconnen United – entered into the 2015 FFA Cup preliminary rounds in a later round than the rest of the Capital Football NPL sides.

Previous Winners 1962–2012

All-time record

All time winners list including Pre-NPL era and NPL era (1962 to current).

See also

Soccer in the Australian Capital Territory
Sport in the Australian Capital Territory

External links
Capital Football official website

Notes

References 

 
Soccer in the Australian Capital Territory
Recurring sporting events established in 1962
1962 establishments in Australia